Sue Gross (born in February 1950) is an American billionaire philanthropist. She was formerly the President of the William and Sue Gross Foundation until creating the Sue J. Gross Foundation in 2017. Her net worth is estimated at $1.3 billion.

Early life and education 
Sue Gross was born in February 1950 in Phoenix Arizona. She has two sisters: Sally Warpinski and Sandra Stubban. In 1985, Sue moved to Laguna Beach, California, where she has been a resident since.

Career 
Sue has served on the following Boards: UCI Sue & Bill Gross School of Nursing Dean’s Cabinet, OC Teacher of the Year, and Irvine Cove Community Board.

Philanthropy 
Sue Gross is a known and dedicated philanthropist. As president of the William and Sue Gross Family Foundation, Sue was in charge of and directed the more than $700 million the foundation gave to worthy causes in healthcare, medical research, and education.

Bill Gross publicly acknowledged Sue Gross’ leadership and contributions to the family foundation in an interview with Bloomberg in 2016 stating, “Sue’s in charge of that [the foundation]. She spends all her time looking for opportunities, a lot of it local. I report to her."

Sue is no longer connected to the foundation, a representative said, and runs another under her own name.

On January 21, 2005, Duke University in Durham, North Carolina, announced a $23.5 million gift from Bill and Sue Gross to endow undergraduate and medical school scholarships, as well as support business school faculty members. “Now [Bill] and Sue are making an investment in the lives of countless students, whose Duke education will benefit them and all those it will enable them to serve. Continuing to attract excellent students and enlarging the endowment to support our ‘need-blind’ admissions policy are among my highest priorities, and I am profoundly grateful that the Grosses have so generously supported these important goals,” said Duke president Richard H. Brodhead.  Their fortune placed the couple among the preeminent philanthropists in Orange County—in 2010 they made a gift of $10 million in seed money to fund a stem cell laboratory at UC Irvine.  After seeing a heart-wrenching “60 Minutes” report in 2012, the couple reportedly started writing anonymous $15,000 checks to workers laid off from the Space Shuttle program after NASA ended it. 

Bill and Sue Gross’s largest gift was $40 million to the University of California, Irvine in 2016 to establish a nursing school and assist in the construction of a new building to house it. The contribution, which the university said would help address critical healthcare concerns, was the largest single gift ever to UCI.

Together, the couple became synonymous with Southern California philanthropy, with Sue leading their eponymous foundation. Hospitals and research wings throughout the state bear the Gross family name, as well as a $10 million Smithsonian Institution stamp-collecting gallery in Washington, DC, where they avid philatelist’s collection is on display.

In 2017, Sue Gross started her own charitable vehicle, Sue J. Gross Foundation. 

The first announced donation was a portion of the $36.9 million in proceeds from Sue's sale of Pablo Picasso’s “Le Repos”. She donated $35,000 in October 2018 to the inaugural Chef Masters event on behalf of the Alzheimer’s Family Center in Orange County. She gave $5,000 to the Los Angeles Center for Law and Justice’s 46th Annual Awards Gala in May 2019.

Personal life 
In 1985, Sue married Bill H. Gross, the billionaire co-founder of Pacific Investment Management Co. before Bill left to join Janus Capital Group (now Janus Henderson) in September 2014.[1] Together, the two had a son: musician and entrepreneur Nick Gross, with Bill Gross. She was also the stepmother to Bill Gross’ two adult children from a former marriage. Sue and Bill divorced in 2018.

Sue is a noted fan of fine art. Bill even praised her abilities in a 2015 letter to investors, saying she loved to trace her own versions of famous works by projecting them onto a blank canvas.   Her former husband characterized her as "the artist in the family. She likes to paint replicas of some of the famous pieces, using an overhead projector to copy the outlines and then just sort of fill in the spaces. ‘Why spend $20 million?’ she’d say – ‘I can paint that one for $75’, and I must admit that one fabulous Picasso with signature ‘Sue’, heads the fireplace mantle in our bedroom." 

When it came to divvying up their assets, in August 2017, Sue won a coin flip for “Les Repos,” a sensual 1932 painting of Picasso’s “golden muse” and lover, Marie-Therese Walter.  The Picasso became a source of contention during the couple's divorce when Bill Gross accused his ex-wife of switching out the original Picasso "Le Repos" with a forgery though legal testimony made it clear that Mr. Gross had instructed her to “take all the furniture and art you like” and a subsequent media report pointed out Mr. Gross was aware of the existence of a replica.  Through a representative, Sue claimed there was no way Bill could have been fooled by her imitation – no matter how pristine – because it has a different frame than the original Picasso. 

In another case, Sue Gross played a practical joke on her ex-husband when he was expecting a delivery of the rare 1-cent Z-Grill stamp from 1868 featuring Benjamin Franklin as the final piece of his stamp collection. Worth an estimated $2.97 million, the stamp arrived at the Gross home, where Sue accepted the package and opened it. She created a "new" Z-Grill and marked the fake stamp in pesos, then repackaged the faux Z-Grill in a FedEx envelope. After he figured out the ruse, Gross put both the real stamp and impostor in his stamp album, writing the $2.97 million cost under the real stamp, and "priceless" under Sue’s version, which he admitted was the favorite of the two.

Divorce 
By the summer of 2016, Sue had moved out of the couple’s $31 million seaside mansion in Laguna Beach, opting to split her time among their two homes in the Los Angeles area because of Bill’s “increasingly erratic and abusive behavior,” she alleged in court documents filed later that year.  She filed for divorce on November 22, 2016.

"After I filed the petition, Bill commenced a rampage against me and members of my family,” she alleged in court filings. Sue and her attorneys filed copies of these emails with the court as part of her evidence in an application for a temporary restraining order against Bill." Temporary restraining orders have been issued at one point or another against both parties. Sue received roughly $1.3 billion in the divorce including a $36 million house in Laguna Beach and half of the couple's art collection.

Real estate 
Sue Gross is a significant owner of residential real estate in Southern California, with two homes in Beverly Hills, and five houses and a lot in the private community of Irvine Cove in Laguna Beach, several of which she received in the divorce from Bill Gross. Sue has been investing in real estate for more than 30 years and is estimated to have netted millions of dollars over the years.

References 

1950 births
Living people
American philanthropists
American billionaires
Female billionaires